Kamran Nazeer OBE (born 1978) is a British Pakistani author and civil servant.

Life and career 
Nazeer was born as Emran Mian in Glasgow, where he studied law. Deciding not to become a lawyer, he then went to Corpus Christi College, Cambridge for his PhD and finally joined the British civil service as a policy adviser in Whitehall. He now lives in London with his French wife.

His first book, Send In the Idiots: Stories From the Other Side of Autism, was published in March 2006 under his penname. He is also a frequent contributor to Prospect magazine.

Awards and nominations
Mian was appointed an OBE in the 2011 Queen's Birthday Honours.

In January 2014, Mian was nominated for the Civil Servant of the Year award at the British Muslim Awards.

Selected works
Send In the Idiots: Stories From the Other Side of Autism, 
"The Curious Case of Exclusionary Reasons", Canadian Journal of Law and Jurisprudence, Volume XV, Number 1 (January 2002) pp. 99–124
"Mandarin intellectuals", Prospect (July 2006)

References

1977 births
Living people
Writers from Glasgow
Scottish people of Pakistani descent
Civil servants from Glasgow
British writers of Pakistani descent
People on the autism spectrum